Down the Drain may refer to:

 Down the Drain (CSI), an episode of the TV series CSI: Crime Scene Investigation
 Down the Drain (film), a 1990 American comedy film